is a passenger railway station located in the city of Kuwana,  Mie Prefecture, Japan, operated by the private railway operator Yōrō Railway.

Lines

Station layout
The station consists of one side platform serving bi-directional traffic. There is no station building but only a weather shelter on the platform. The station is unattended.

Platforms

Adjacent stations 

|-
!colspan=5|Yōrō Railway

History
Harima Station opened on December 29, 1939 as a station on the Yōrō Railway. The Yōrō Railway merged with the Sangu Electric Railway on August 1, 1940, and through a series of mergers became part of the Kansai Express Railway on June 1, 1944. The line was split off into the new Yōrō Railway on October 1, 2007.

Passenger statistics
In fiscal 2019, the station was used by an average of 265 passengers daily (boarding passengers only).

Surrounding area
 Kuwana Harima Post Office

See also
 List of Railway Stations in Japan

References

External links

 Yōrō Railway Official website  

Railway stations in Japan opened in 1939
Railway stations in Mie Prefecture
Stations of Yōrō Railway
Kuwana, Mie